Maryborough may refer to:

 Maryborough, Queensland,  Australia
 Maryborough Base Hospital
 Maryborough, Victoria,  Australia
 The former name of Portlaoise, Republic of Ireland, from 1557 to 1929 
 City of Maryborough (disambiguation)
 Electoral district of Maryborough (disambiguation)
 Maryborough Airport (disambiguation)
 Maryborough Post Office (disambiguation)
 Maryborough railway station (disambiguation)
 HMAS Maryborough, two ships of the Royal Australian Navy

See also